John William Fyfe (born 1839, date of death unknown) was a teaching physician in New York in the late nineteenth and early twentieth centuries.  

He was a physician of the eclectic school and author of herbal manuals for physicians. His works include The Essentials of Modern Materia Medica and Therapeutics, also known as Fyfe's Materia Medica (1903); Pocket Essentials of Modern Materia Medica and Therapeutics (1911); and Specific Diagnosis and Specific Medication (1909).

On February 27, 1839, Fyfe was born in Swan's Island, Maine, a very small island town off the coast of the mainland of Hancock County. Fyfe grew up and lived in Saugatuck, Connecticut—a small neighborhood within the town of Westport—for most of his life. He was the president of the Connecticut Eclectic State Medical Examination Board and an author of multiple works, including a family genealogy.

References

Herringshaw's American Blue-book of Biography: Prominent Americans of 1915, Thirty Thousand Biographies; Thomas William Herringshaw; American Publishers' Association; Chicago, Illinois; 1915

External links
Fyfe's Materia Medica
Fyfe's books on the Library of Congress Catalog

Herbalists
American medical writers
Year of death missing
1839 births
20th-century American non-fiction writers
People from Hancock County, Maine
People from Westport, Connecticut
20th-century American male writers
American male non-fiction writers